The yard (symbol: yd) is an English unit of length in both the British imperial and US customary systems of measurement equalling 3 feet or 36 inches. Since 1959 it has been by international agreement standardized as exactly 0.9144 meter. A distance of 1,760 yards is equal to 1 mile.

The US survey yard is very slightly longer.

Name

The term, yard derives from the Old English ,  etc., which was used for branches, staves and measuring rods. It is first attested in the late 7th century laws of Ine of Wessex, where the "yard of land" mentioned is the yardland, an old English unit of tax assessment equal to  hide. Around the same time the Lindisfarne Gospels account of the messengers from John the Baptist in the Gospel of Matthew used it for a branch swayed by the wind.

The use of the word ‘yard’ ( or ) to describe this length is first attested in William Langland's poem on Piers Plowman. The usage seems to derive from the prototype standard rods held by the king and his magistrates (see below).

The word ‘yard’ is a homonym of ‘yard’ in the sense of an enclosed area of land. This second meaning of ‘yard’ has an etymology related to the word ‘garden’ and is not related to the unit of measurement.

History

Origin
The origin of the yard measure is uncertain. Both the Romans and the Welsh used multiples of a shorter foot, but  Roman feet was a "step" and 3 Welsh feet was a "pace". This has led some to derive the yard of three English feet from pacing; others from the ell or cubit; and still others from Henry I's arm standard (see below). Based on the etymology of the other "yard", some suggest it originally derived from the girth of a person's waist, while others believe it originated as a cubic measure. One official British report writes:

From ell to yard
The earliest record of a prototype measure is the statute II Edgar Cap. 8 (AD 959  963), which survives in several variant manuscripts. In it, Edgar the Peaceful directed the Witenagemot at Andover that "the measure held at Winchester" should be observed throughout his realm. (Some manuscripts read "at London and at Winchester".) The statutes of William I similarly refer to and uphold the standard measures of his predecessors without naming them.

William of Malmesbury's Deeds of the Kings of England records that during the reign of Henry I (1100 - 1135), "the measure of his arm was applied to correct the false ell of the traders and enjoined on all throughout England." The folktale that the length was bounded by the king's nose was added some centuries later. C.M. Watson dismisses William's account as "childish", but William was among the most conscientious and trustworthy medieval historians. The French "king's foot" was supposed to have derived from Charlemagne, and the English kings subsequently repeatedly intervened to impose shorter units with the aim of increasing tax revenue.

The earliest surviving definition of this shorter unit appears in the Act on the Composition of Yards and Perches, one of the statutes of uncertain date tentatively dated to the reign of Edward I or II . Its wording varies in surviving accounts. One reads:

It is ordained that 3 grains of barley dry and round do make an inch, 12 inches make 1 foot, 3 feet make 1 yard, 5 yards and a half make a perch, and 40 perches in length and 4 in breadth make an acre.

The Liber Horn compilation (1311) includes that statute with slightly different wording and adds:

And be it remembered that the iron yard of our Lord the King containeth 3 feet and no more, and a foot ought to contain 12 inches by the right measure of this yard measured, to wit, the 36th part of this yard rightly measured maketh 1 inch neither more nor less and 5 yards and a half make a perch that is 16 feet and a half measured by the aforesaid yard of our Lord the King.

In some early books, this act was appended to another statute of uncertain date titled the Statute for the Measuring of Land. The act was not repealed until the Weights and Measures Act of 1824.

Yard and inch
In a law of 1439 (18 Henry VI. Cap. 16.) the sale of cloth by the "yard and handful" was abolished, and the "yard and inch" instituted (see ell).

There shall be but one Measure of Cloth through the Realm by the Yard and the Inch, and not by the Yard and Handful, according to the London Measure.

According to Connor, cloth merchants had previously sold cloth by the yard and handful to evade high taxes on cloth (the extra handful being essentially a black-market transaction). Enforcement efforts resulted in cloth merchants switching over to the yard and inch, at which point the government gave up and made the yard and inch official. In 1552, the yard and inch for cloth measurement was again sanctioned in law (5 & 6 Edward VI Cap. 6. An Act for the true making of Woolen Cloth.)

The yard and inch for cloth measurement was also sanctioned again in legislation of 1557–1558 (4 & 5 Philip and Mary Cap. 5. An act touching the making of woolen clothes. par. IX.)

IX. Item, That every ordinary kersie mentioned in the said act shall contain in length in the water betwixt xvi. and xvii. yards, yard and inch; and being well scoured thicked, milled, dressed and fully dried, shall weigh nineteen pounds the piece at the least:...

As recently as 1593, the same principle is found mentioned once again (35 Elizabeth. Cap. 10. An act for the reformation of sundry abuses in clothes, called Devonshire kerjies  or dozens, according to a proclamation of the thirty-fourth year of the reign of our sovereign lady the Queen that now is. par. III.)

(2) and each and every of the same Devonshire kersies or dozens, so being raw, and as it cometh forth off the weaver's loom (without racking, stretching, straining or other device to encrease the length thereof) shall contain in length between fifteen and sixteen yards by the measure of yard and inch by the rule,...

Physical standards
One of the oldest yard-rods in existence is the clothyard of the Worshipful Company of Merchant Taylors. It consists of a hexagonal iron rod  in diameter and  short of a yard, encased within a silver rod bearing the hallmark 1445. In the early 15th century, the Merchant Taylors Company was authorized to "make search" at the opening of the annual St. Bartholomew's Day Cloth Fair. In the mid-18th century, Graham compared the standard yard of the Royal Society to other existing standards. These were a "long-disused" standard made in 1490 during the reign of Henry VII, and a brass yard and a brass ell from 1588 in the time of Queen Elizabeth and still in use at the time, held at the Exchequer; a brass yard and a brass ell at the Guildhall; and a brass yard presented to the Clock-Makers' Company by the Exchequer in 1671. The Exchequer yard was taken as "true"; the variation was found to be + to − of an inch, and an additional graduation for the Exchequer yard was made on the Royal Society's standard. In 1758 the legislature required the construction of a standard yard, which was made from the Royal Society's standard and was deposited with the clerk of the House of Commons; it was divided into feet, one of the feet into inches, and one of the inches into tenths. A copy of it, but with upright cheeks between which other measuring rods could be placed, was made for the Exchequer for commercial use.

19th-century Britain
Following Royal Society investigations by John Playfair, Hyde Wollaston and John Warner in 1814 a committee of parliament proposed defining the standard yard based upon the length of a seconds pendulum. This idea was examined but not approved. The Weights and Measures Act of 1824 (5° George IV. Cap. 74.) An Act for ascertaining and establishing Uniformity of Weights and Measures stipulates that:
<blockquote>From and after the First Day of May One thousand eight hundred and twenty five the Straight Line or Distance between the Centres of the Two Points in the Gold Studs of the Straight Brass Rod now in the Custody of the Clerk of the House of Commons whereon the Words and Figures "Standard Yard 1760" are engraved shall be and the same is hereby declared to be the original and genuine Standard of that Measure of Length or lineal Extension called a Yard; and that the same Straight Line or Distance between the Centres of the said Two Points in the said Gold Studs in the said Brass Rod the Brass being at the Temperature of Sixty two Degrees by Fahrenheit'''s Thermometer shall be and is hereby denominated the Imperial Standard Yard and shall be and is hereby declared to be the Unit or only Standard Measure of Extension, wherefrom or whereby all other Measures of Extension whatsoever, whether the same be lineal, superficial or solid, shall be derived, computed and ascertained; and that all Measures of Length shall be taken in Parts or Multiples, or certain Proportions of the said Standard Yard; and that One third Part of the said Standard Yard shall be a Foot, and the Twelfth Part of such Foot shall be an Inch; and that the Pole or Perch in Length shall contain Five such Yards and a Half, the Furlong Two hundred and twenty such Yards, and the Mile One thousand seven hundred and sixty such Yards.</blockquote>

In 1834, the primary Imperial yard standard was partially destroyed in a fire known as the Burning of Parliament.. In 1838, a commission was formed to reconstruct the lost standards, including the troy pound, which had also been destroyed. In 1845, a new yard standard was constructed based on two previously existing standards known as A1 and A2, both of which had been made for the Ordnance Survey, and R.S. 46, the yard of the Royal Astronomical Society. All three had been compared to the Imperial standard before the fire.

The new standard was made of Baily's metal No. 4 consisting of 16 parts copper,  parts tin, and 1 part zinc. It was 38 inches long and 1 inch square. The Weights and Measures Act of 1855 granted official recognition to the new standards. Between 1845 and 1855 forty yard standards were constructed, one of which was selected as the new Imperial standard. Four others, known as Parliamentary Copies, were distributed to The Royal Mint, The Royal Society of London, The Royal Observatory at Greenwich, and the New Palace at Westminster, commonly called the Houses of Parliament. The other 35 yard standards were distributed to the cities of London, Edinburgh, and Dublin, as well as the United States and other countries (although only the first five had official status). The imperial standard received by the United States is known as "Bronze Yard No. 11"

The Weights and Measures Act 1878 confirmed the status of the existing yard standard, mandated regular intercomparisons between the several yard standards, and authorized the construction of one additional Parliamentary Copy (made in 1879 and known as Parliamentary Copy VI).

Definition of the yard in terms of the meter
Subsequent measurements revealed that the yard standard and its copies were shrinking at the rate of one part per million every twenty years due to the gradual release of strain incurred during the fabrication process.
The international prototype meter, on the other hand, was comparatively stable. A measurement made in 1895 determined the length of the meter at  inches relative to the imperial standard yard. The Weights and Measures (Metric) Act of 1897 in conjunction with Order in Council 411 (1898) made this relationship official.

The yard (known as the "international yard" in the United States) was legally defined to be exactly 0.9144 meter in 1959 under an agreement in 1959 between Australia, Canada, New Zealand, South Africa, the United Kingdom and the United States. In the UK, the provisions of the treaty were ratified by the Weights and Measures Act of 1963. The Imperial Standard Yard of 1855 was renamed the United Kingdom Primary Standard Yard and retained its official status as the national prototype yard.Weights and Measures Act 1985 BAILY’S METAL. PARLIAMENTARY COPY (VI) OF THE IMPERIAL STANDARD YARD. 41 & 42 VICTORIA, CHAPTER 49. STANDARD YARD AT 62° FAHT. CAST IN 1878

Current use

The yard is used as the standard unit of field-length measurement in American, Canadian and association football, cricket pitch dimensions, and in some countries, golf fairway measurements.

There are corresponding units of area and volume, the square yard and cubic yard respectively. These are sometimes referred to simply as "yards" when no ambiguity is possible, for example an American or Canadian concrete mixer may be marked with a capacity of "9 yards" or "1.5 yards", where cubic yards are obviously referred to.

Yards are also used and are the legal requirement on road signs for shorter distances in the United Kingdom, and are also frequently found in conversation between Britons much like in the United States for distance.

Textiles and fat quarters 
The yard, subdivided into eighths, is used for the purchase of fabrics in the United States and United Kingdom and was previously used elsewhere. In the United States the term "fat quarter" is used for a piece of fabric which is half a yard in length cut from a roll and then cut again along the width so that it is only half the width of the roll, thus the same area as a piece of one quarter yard cut from the full width of the roll; these pieces are popular for patchwork and quilting. The term "fat eighth" is also used, for a piece of one quarter yard from half the roll width, the same area as one eighth cut from the roll.

Equivalences
For purposes of measuring cloth, the early yard was divided by the binary method into two, four, eight and sixteen parts. The two most common divisions were the fourth and sixteenth parts. The quarter of a yard (9 inches) was known as the "quarter" without further qualification, while the sixteenth of a yard (2.25 inches) was called a nail. The eighth of a yard (4.5 inches) was sometimes called a finger, but was more commonly referred to simply as an eighth of a yard, while the half-yard (18 inches) was called "half a yard".

Other units related to the yard, but not specific to cloth measurement: two yards are a fathom, a quarter of a yard (when not referring to cloth) is a span.

Conversions
 international yard (defined 1959):
1250 (international) yards = 1143 meters
1 (international) yard = 0.9144 meters (exact)
1 (international) statute mile = 8 international furlongs = 80 international chains = 1760 (international) yards

 pre-1959 US yard'' – defined 1869, implemented 1893, deprecated 2023
For survey purposes, certain pre-1959 units were retained, usually prefaced by the word "survey," among them the survey inch, survey foot, and survey mile, also known as the statute mile. The rod and furlong exist only in their pre-1959 form and are thus not prefaced by the word "survey." However, it is not clear if a "survey yard" actually exists. If it did, its hypothetical values would be as follows:
3937 survey yards = 3600 meters
1 survey yard ≈  meters
1 survey mile = 8 furlongs = 80 chains = 1760 survey yards
 Comparing international yards and survey yards
 (international) yards =  survey yards =  meters 
1 (international) yard =  survey yards (exact)
1 (international) mile =  survey miles(exact)

See also
 Guz, the yard of Asia
 3 ft gauge railways
 Vara
 Yardstick

Notes

References

Citations

Bibliography
 .
 .
 .
 .
 .
 .
 .
 . 
 .
 .
 .
 .
 .  &  & 
 .

External links 
 

Units of length
Imperial units
Customary units of measurement in the United States
Human-based units of measurement